Pelomys is a genus of rodent in the family Muridae endemic to Africa.
It contains the following species:
 Bell groove-toothed swamp rat (Pelomys campanae)
 Creek groove-toothed swamp rat (Pelomys fallax)
 Hopkins's groove-toothed swamp rat (Pelomys hopkinsi)
 Issel's groove-toothed swamp rat (Pelomys isseli)
 Least groove-toothed swamp rat (Pelomys minor)

References

 
Rodent genera
Taxa named by Wilhelm Peters
Taxonomy articles created by Polbot